Medeterinae is a subfamily of flies in the family Dolichopodidae.

Genera
Atlatlia Bickel, 1986
Cryptopygiella Robinson, 1975
Dominicomyia Robinson, 1975
Grootaertia Grichanov, 1999
Hurleyella Runyon & Robinson, 2010 (subfamily incertae sedis)
†Medeterites Grichanov, 2010
Microchrysotus Robinson, 1964
Microcyrtura Robinson, 1964
Micromedetera Robinson, 1975
†Paleothrypticus Ngô-Muller, Garrouste & Nel, 2020
Papallacta Bickel, 2006
Pharcoura Bickel, 2007
Pindaia Bickel, 2014
Protomedetera Tang, Grootaert & Yang, 2018
†Salishomyia Bickel, 2019
 Tribe Medeterini Lioy, 1864
Asioligochaetus Negrobov, 1966
Craterophorus Lamb, 1921
Cyrturella Collin, 1952
Demetera Grichanov, 2011
Dolichophorus Lichtwardt, 1902
Medetera Fischer von Waldheim, 1819
Medeterella Grichanov, 2011
Nikitella Grichanov, 2011
Paramedetera Grootaert & Meuffels, 1997
Saccopheronta Becker, 1914 (sometimes a synonym of Medetera)
 Tribe Systenini Robinson, 1970
Euxiphocerus Parent, 1935
†Palaeosystenus Grichanov, Negrobov & Selivanova, 2014
†Systenites Grichanov, Negrobov & Selivanova, 2014
Systenomorphus Grichanov, 2010
Systenoneurus Grichanov, 2010
Systenus Loew, 1857
 Tribe Thrypticini Negrobov, 1986
Corindia Bickel, 1986
Thrypticus Gerstäcker, 1864
 Tribe Udzungwomyiini Grichanov, 2019
Maipomyia Bickel, 2004
Neomedetera Zhu, Yang & Grootaert, 2007
Udzungwomyia Grichanov, 2018

References

 
Dolichopodidae subfamilies